IMAGE cDNA clones are a collection of DNA vectors containing cDNAs from various organisms including human, mouse, rat, non-human primates, zebrafish, pufferfish, Xenopus (frogs), and cow.  Together they represent a more or less complete set of expressed genes from these organisms. IMAGE stands for integrated molecular analysis of genomes and their expression.

Curators 
From 1993 to 2007, the cDNA library was maintained by the IMAGE Consortium, a joint effort of four academic groups led by Drs. Greg Lennon, Charles Auffray, Mihael Polymeropoulos, and Marcelo Bento Soares. At the end of 2007, the consortium handed over operations and stocks to a company associated with Open Biosystems.

See also 
 complementary DNA (cDNA)
 cDNA library
 expressed sequence tags (EST)
 vector (molecular biology)
 cloning vector

References

External links 
 IMAGE Consortium homepage
 Lennon et al. publication introducing IMAGE, Genomics 33 1996
 article in The Scientist  about the IMAGE library (1999)

Molecular biology
DNA
Gene expression